The Lark Distillery is a producer of Australian whisky and liqueurs in Hobart, Tasmania, Australia.  The distillery takes its name from Bill Lark.

History
Lark Distillery Single Malt Whiskey won a Gold Medal at the 2019 London Spirits Competition.

Lark Distillery became the first distillery  in Australia to become carbon neutral in April 2021.

References

External links
 

Australian distilled drinks
Australian whisky
Distilleries in Australia
Australian companies established in 1992
Food and drink companies established in 1992
Companies based in Tasmania